Kevin S. McClatchy (born January 13, 1963) is the chairman of McClatchy and former owner of the Pittsburgh Pirates baseball team.  He led a group of investors that purchased the team in 1996, and served as the team's CEO and lead owner until 2007, when Bob Nutting took over as lead owner, and McClatchy and Nutting hired Frank Coonelly to become CEO.

Early life
McClatchy was born in Sacramento, California, the grandson of two eminent figures, George F. Kennan and Charles Kenny McClatchy. Prior to purchasing the Pirates, he owned the minor-league Modesto A's. In addition to his baseball work, he is a director of The McClatchy Company, a newspaper publisher owned by his family (he succeeded Gary B. Pruitt as chairman of the board of the company in April 2012). McClatchy is an alumnus of the Sigma Alpha Epsilon fraternity.

Kevin is an alumnus of the Trinity-Pawling School in Pawling, New York.

Time with Pirates
McClatchy was the leader and plurality investor in a group that paid $95 million ($ today) for the Pittsburgh Pirates in February 1996. McClatchy immediately assumed the posts of managing general partner and chief executive officer, becoming the public face of the ownership group.

McClatchy was a member of Major League Baseball's executive council and the labor and international committees. At some point after 2005, which is not entirely known because the Pirates are a private corporation, Wheeling, West Virginia newspaper publisher G. Ogden Nutting and his family became the plurality and then majority owners in the franchise. Bob Nutting, Ogden's son, had already served as chairman of the board since 2002. The Nuttings, however, mostly shied from the spotlight and allowed McClatchy to continue serving as the main or even sole voice of the ownership group.

In 2006, McClatchy speculated openly about resigning, possibly even selling the team, if the Pirates did not improve. He affirmed that he was frustrated with his own team, referencing popular and political complaints about the "promise" he made that the publicly funded PNC Park would provide the owners with all the resources they needed to field a winning team. On October 4, 2006, however, McClatchy announced that despite another losing season, he would remain in his offices, and made only a few minor personnel changes. On January 12, 2007, the Pirates announced that Bob Nutting would replace McClatchy as the Pirates principal owner, though McClatchy stayed on as CEO and operating head of the franchise. During McClatchy's reign as owner, the Pirates never achieved a winning season. The closest they came was in 1997, when they finished 79-83–which was also the only time they finished higher than third in their division.

On July 6, 2007, it was announced that McClatchy would step down as CEO after the 2007 MLB season. On September 8, 2007, Ken Rosenthal of Fox Sports reported that baseball executive Frank Coonelly will be hired by the Pirates to replace McClatchy as CEO. This report came just one day after the Pirates fired General Manager Dave Littlefield.  The hiring of Coonelly was announced September 13.

Personal life
On September 22, 2012, McClatchy came out as gay in an interview with Frank Bruni of The New York Times.

As of 2013, McClatchy continues to live in the Pittsburgh suburb of Ligonier, Pennsylvania.

References

External links

1963 births
Living people
American LGBT businesspeople
American LGBT sportspeople
LGBT people from California
LGBT people from Pennsylvania
Major League Baseball executives
Major League Baseball owners
Major League Baseball team presidents
Pittsburgh Pirates executives
Pittsburgh Pirates owners
Businesspeople from Sacramento, California
University of California, Santa Barbara alumni
McClatchy people
American chief executives of professional sports organizations
Gay sportsmen